Geranyl-diphosphate diphosphate-lyase may refer to:
Enzymes